The Jan von Osten House (Danish: Jan von Ostens Gård) is a listed Baroque style property at the corner of Amaliegade with Toldbodgade in the Frederiksstaden neighbourhood of central Copenhagen, Denmark. The building was the city home of Classen from 1770 until 1792 and is still owned by and serves as headquarters of Det Classenske Fideicommis until 1970.

History
The building at No.. 40-42 was built for master timber Jan von Osten to a design by Niels Eigtved from 1752-54. Construction took place between 1756 and 1760.

The building was acquired by the prominent industrialist Johan Frederik Classen and made his city home in 1770. The building was ceded to Det Classenske Fideicommis following Classen's death in 1792. The foundation was responsible for the construction of the Classen Library at the neighbouring site- The foundation owned the building and was headquartered there until 1970 when it moved to Corselitze on the island of Falster.

The prominent industrialist Johan Frederik Classen lived in the house from 1770 until his death in 1792. The agent Conrad Caspar Hauser  also lived in the building from 1670 until 1783.

Prime minister Frederik Julius Kaas lived in the house from 1812 until 1820. Later residents include the politician and baron Carl Blixen-Finecke who lived there in the 1850s and also owned Dallund Manor on the island of Funen. The naval officer Siguard Bojesen was at the time of the 1885 a resident in the building.

Architecture
The 12-bay main wing has a symmetrical facade with two gates and a central projection tipped by a triangular pediment on amaliegade. The complex also comprises a rear wing and several lower buildings.

See also
 English Terrace (Toldbodgade)

References

External links

 Source

Houses in Copenhagen
Listed residential buildings in Copenhagen
Houses completed in 1760
Baroque architecture in Copenhagen
Buildings and structures associated with the Classen family